The 2017 Thailand Five's (Thai:) is an international futsal competition. It was organized by the Football Association of Thailand or the FAT. The tournament is set to be a round-robin format with all matches being held at the Bangkok Arena in Bangkok, Thailand on 10 to 12 September 2017.

This edition will feature the host Thailand and three invited teams. The three teams that have been invited are 2016 FIFA Futsal World Cup  champion, Argentina, 2016 Thailand Five's champion, Kazakhstan and Mozambique.

Participant teams
The 2017 Thailand Five's is following 4 teams include

Venue
The matches are played at the Bangkok Arena in Bangkok.

Ranking

Results
All times are Thailand Standard Time (UTC+07:00).

Day 1

Day 2

Day 3

Final ranking

Goalscorers

Broadcasters
 Thailand: Thairath TV
World Wide: Thairath's YouTube channel

Ranking after the matches

References

External links 

International futsal competitions hosted by Thailand
2017 in futsal
2017 in Thai football